DDO 169 (also known as UGC 8331) is an irregular galaxy located in the constellation Canes Venatici. It is a member of the M51 Group of galaxies and measures approximately 5 × 1.5 kiloparsecs (16,000 × 5,000 lightyears). The galaxy's large-scale structure is very unorganized and it has two clusters of stars in its outer portions in addition to the cluster in the center. These clusters make it practically impossible to determine the galaxy's rotation curve and contributes to a large variation in distance figures that are derived with different methods. The exact distance to the galaxy is not known, although a 1998 paper estimated the distance as 8.23 megaparsecs.

References

UGC 8331r
UGC 8331
M51 Group
8331
46127